Calisto herophile is a butterfly of the family Nymphalidae. It is endemic to Cuba and the Bahamas. The species inhabits many habitats in Cuba, from suburban areas near major cities to the edges of evergreen and rainforests up to 1,100 meters of altitude, always disturbed in some degree.

The length of the forewings is 14–19 mm for males and 17–21 mm for females. Adults are found year-round throughout Cuba.

The larvae feed on various grasses. They eat the entire shell after hatching and feed at night, remaining in the lower parts of grasses during the day.

Subspecies
Calisto herophile herophile (Cuba)
Calisto herophile apollinis Bates, 1934
Calisto herophile parsonsi Clench, 1943 (Cuba)

Gallery

References

Calisto (butterfly)
Butterflies described in 1823
Fauna of the Bahamas
Insects of Cuba